This is a list of defunct airlines of Estonia.

See also
 List of airlines of Estonia
 List of airports in Estonia

References

Estonia
Airlines
Airlines, defunct